Foreign Affair: The Farewell Tour (also known as the Foreign Affair: European Tour 1990) is the seventh concert tour by singer Tina Turner. The tour supported her seventh studio album Foreign Affair (1989). The tour was Turner's first stadium tour and only reached European countries. Overall, the tour was attended by approximately three million people—breaking the record for a European tour that was previously set by The Rolling Stones.

The tour is notable as Turner's only tour to not reach North America. Since the tour was considered a farewell tour (at that time), Turner wanted to exclusively tour Europe to thank her fans for supporting her career after she became a solo artist.

Background 
The tour was advertised as a "farewell" tour as Turner began to concentrate on potential acting roles. During an interview, Turner stated, "I've always thought this would be the final one but I must admit I now have mixed feelings. I'm the first woman to fill all these stadiums and the feeling from all those fans night after night was fantastic. I don't want to close that door completely. I'm going away for about a year and when I'm ready to return, I just hope the fans will want whatever I have to offer."

Turner would return to touring in 1993 with her North American tour, "What's Love? Tour".

Broadcasts and recordings 

The groundbreaking tour was filmed at the Estadi Olímpic de Montjuïc in Barcelona and was released on VHS titled, "Do You Want Some Action?". To celebrate Turner's 2021 induction into the Rock and Roll Hall of Fame, a remastered version of the recording was released in 2021, alongside an audio CD of the full concert.

Fan-recorded footage of opening night in Antwerp is available on YouTube. The concert at Pallatrussadi, Milan was filmed and was also used as part of the MTV film. Although the real professional, multi-camera recording is not in circulation, there is a fan-shot, full-length video of the concert on YouTube.

The concert at Woburn Abbey was filmed and part of which was used in an MTV mini-documentary, promoting Turner's tour. The intro to this show was used as part of an interview with Turner and the music video to "Be Tender with Me Baby" is the encore to this show. It is available on YouTube and the single for the song. There are no known copies of the full-length in circulation.

Additionally, the concert in Athens was broadcast live on ET2.

Personnel 
Bass guitar: Bob Fiet
Dancers: Annie Behringer and LeJeune Richardson
Drums: Jack Bruno
Guitar: John Miles and James Ralston
Keyboards: Timmy Cappello and Miffy Smith
Percussion: Timmy Cappello
Piano: Kenny Moore
Saxophone: Timmy Cappello
Supporting vocals: Timmy Cappello, John Miles, Ollie Marland, Kenny Moore, and James Ralston

Opening act 
The Neville Brothers

Setlist 
{{hidden
| headercss = background: #ccccff; font-size: 100%; width: 65%;
| contentcss = text-align: left; font-size: 100%; width: 75%;
| header = April 27, 1990 – May 22, 1990
| content =
Act 1
"The Best"
"Ask Me How I Feel"
"River Deep – Mountain High"
"Private Dancer"
"We Don't Need Another Hero (Thunderdome)"
"I Can't Stand the Rain"
"Nutbush City Limits"
Act 2
"Steamy Windows"
"Undercover Agent for the Blues"
"Foreign Affair"
"Typical Male"
"I Don't Wanna Lose You"
"What's Love Got to Do with It?"
"Let's Stay Together"
"Proud Mary"
Encore
"Good Times"
"Be Tender with Me Baby"
"Better Be Good to Me"
}}

{{hidden
| headercss = background: #ccccff; font-size: 100%; width: 65%;
| contentcss = text-align: left; font-size: 100%; width: 75%;
| header = May 24, 1990 – November 4, 1990
| content =
Act 1
"Steamy Windows"
"Typical Male"
"Foreign Affair"
"Undercover Agent for the Blues"
"Ask Me How I Feel"
"We Don't Need Another Hero (Thunderdome)"
"Private Dancer"
"I Can't Stand the Rain"
"Nutbush City Limits"
Act 2
"Addicted to Love"
"The Best"
"I Don't Wanna Lose You"
"What's Love Got to Do with It?"
"Let's Stay Together"
"Proud Mary"
Act 3
"What You Get Is What You See"
"Show Some Respect"
"Better Be Good to Me"
Encore
"Be Tender with Me Baby"
}}

Tour dates 

Festivals and other miscellaneous performances
This concert was a part of the "Monte-Carlo Sporting Summer Festival"
This concert was a part of the "NDR2 Open Air Festival"

Cancellations and rescheduled shows

External links 
Foreign Affair Farewell Tour 1990
International Tina Turner Fan Club – Tour – Foreign Affair 1990

Notes

References 

Tina Turner concert tours
1990 concert tours
Farewell concert tours